The Ramon Magsaysay Center (abbreviated as RMC or RM Center) is an 18-storey building located at the corner of Roxas Boulevard and Quintos Street in Malate, Manila, Philippines.

It was built and opened in 1967 and was designed by Alfredo J. Luz and Associates, in consultation with Italian-American Pietro Belluschi and Alfred Yee Associates. It is named after Ramon Magsaysay, the 7th President of the Philippines who died in a plane crash in Cebu in 1957. It previously held the title as the tallest building in the Philippines from 1967-1968, before the completion of the Manila Pavilion Hotel.

Architecture and design
Ruben Payumo of the Alfredo Luz's architectural firm was the project manager for the Ramon Magsaysay Center It is the first structure in the country to sport column-free structural concept. The design used pre-cast and pre-stressed beams like a tree rooted on the ground. The exterior of the building was designed to withstand the salty environment that surrounds the building. It was clad with travertine marble slabs embedded in the frame of the building.

See also
 List of tallest buildings in Metro Manila

References

Buildings and structures in Malate, Manila
Skyscraper office buildings in Metro Manila
Office buildings completed in 1967
Skyscrapers in Manila